Navaphat Wongcharoen (Thai language: นวพรรษ วงค์เจริญ; born 3 March 1997) is a Thai swimmer. He represented Thailand at the 2019 World Aquatics Championships in Gwangju, South Korea. He competed in the men's 100 metre butterfly and men's 200 metre butterfly events.

In 2015, he won the bronze medal in the men's 4 × 100 metre medley relay event at the Southeast Asian Games held in Singapore. In 2018, he represented Thailand at the Asian Games held in Jakarta, Indonesia.

References

External links
 

Living people
1997 births
Navaphat Wongcharoen
Navaphat Wongcharoen
Male butterfly swimmers
Competitors at the 2015 Southeast Asian Games
Competitors at the 2017 Southeast Asian Games
Competitors at the 2019 Southeast Asian Games
Southeast Asian Games medalists in swimming
Navaphat Wongcharoen
Navaphat Wongcharoen
Swimmers at the 2018 Asian Games
Navaphat Wongcharoen
Swimmers at the 2020 Summer Olympics
Navaphat Wongcharoen
Competitors at the 2021 Southeast Asian Games
Navaphat Wongcharoen